Mathias Johansson may refer to:

Mathias Johansson (ice hockey), a former Swedish ice hockey forward
Mathias Johansson (producer), a Swedish music producer part of the team Korpi & Blackcell